Rodina Stadium may refer to:

Rodina Stadium (Khimki)
Rodina Stadium (Kirov)